Uusimaa was a Finnish . However the class was called the Uusimaa-class in Finland since the ship had some unique modifications (i.e. British submarine hunting equipment).

As the Finnish Navy had a manpower restriction after World War II, the navy suffered personnel shortages after the commissioning of the Turunmaa and Karjala. The navy limited therefore the use of its two Hämeenmaa frigates and finally decided to retire them.

Uusimaa was in Finnish Navy service between 1964–1980. She was decommissioned in 1979 and cannibalized for spare parts for the Hämeenmaa.

See also
 The sister ship Hämeenmaa

References

Riga-class frigates
Ships built in the Soviet Union
1954 ships
Cold War frigates of the Soviet Union
Hämeenmaa-class frigates
Cold War frigates of Finland
Finland–Soviet Union relations